The  (from French) or  was an alleged assassination attempt against First Consul of France Napoleon Bonaparte.  The members of the plot were not clearly established. Authorities at the time presented it as an assassination attempt on Napoleon at the exit of the Paris opera house on 18 vendémiaire year IX (10 October 1800), which was prevented by the police force of Joseph Fouché. However, this version was questioned very early on.

In his , Fouché affirmed that, towards mid-September 1800, a plot arose aiming at assassinating Napoleon at the operahouse. Someone named Harel, presented as one of the accomplices, worked in liaison with the war commissioner Lefebvre, to bring the revelations to Louis Antoine Fauvelet de Bourrienne, Napoleon's secretary, indicating the plotters were Giuseppe Ceracchi, Joseph Diana, Joseph Antoine Aréna (brother of the Corsican deputy who had declared against Napoleon); the painter and patriotic fanatic François Topino-Lebrun, and Dominique Demerville, former clerk of the Committee of Public Safety, closely associated with Bertrand Barère de Vieuzac. Harel was charged with drawing up a trap for the plotters; four armed men, laid out for the assassination of Napoleon, on the evening of October 10, after a performance of Les Horaces. The day of the attack, the men stationed by the police force stopped Diana, Ceracchi and their two accomplices. All the others presumably retreated and were apprehended at their residences. 

For modern historians this was a manipulation by the police force, made possible by an agent provocateur, Harel, who had infiltrated the group. After Plot of the Rue Saint-Nicaise, the members of the "daggers conspiracy", presented as a Jacobin plot, were judged in front of the criminal court of The Seine. Four of them were condemned to death 19 nivôse year IX (January 9, 1801), at eleven o'clock in the evening, after three days of debates and the sentence was carried out January 30 after rejection of the appeal.

Conspirators
The members of the plot were: 
 Adjudant Joseph Antoine Aréna, brother of Barthelemy Aréna who had tried to stab Bonaparte at the time of the coup d'état of the 18 Brumaire; 
 Dominique Demerville, former secretary of Barère; 
 Giuseppe Ceracchi, Roman sculptor one of the founders of the Roman republic in 1798; 
 François Topino-Lebrun, painter, former student of Jacques-Louis David and member of the revolutionary tribunal jury; 
 Joseph Diana, 28 years, other Roman insurgent, notary, discharged; 
 Armand Daiteg, 67 years, sculptor, discharged; 
 Denis Lavigne, 66 years, trader, discharged; 
 Madeleine Fumey, 38 years, cook or mistress of Demerville, discharged

Bibliography
Pierre Marie Desmarest Fifteen years of policing under Napoleon, Editions A. Levavasseur, 1833 
Gustave Hue Un Complot de police sous le Consulat, Editions Hachette, 1909

References

1800 crimes in France
1800 in France
Failed assassination attempts in Europe
Napoleon
Conspiracies